Londoner could refer to:

 Londoner, a person from or living in London, the capital of England and the UK
 Londoner, a person from or living in London, Ontario, Canada
 The Londoner, a former newspaper in London, England
 The Londoners, or Londyńczycy, a Polish TV drama series set in London
 Londoner v. City and County of Denver, an important case in United States administrative law

See also
 Londoni, a term for British Bangladeshis
 List of people from London, England
 List of people from London, Ontario